Yee Lai Lee is a former Hong Kong international lawn bowler.

She won a bronze medal in the fours at the 1990 Commonwealth Games in Auckland with Naty Rozario, Jenny Wallis and Angela Chau.

References

Hong Kong female bowls players
Living people
Date of birth missing (living people)
Commonwealth Games medallists in lawn bowls
Commonwealth Games bronze medallists for Hong Kong
Year of birth missing (living people)
Bowls players at the 1990 Commonwealth Games
Medallists at the 1990 Commonwealth Games